Castellote is a municipality located in the province of Teruel, Aragon, Spain. According to the 2010 census, the municipality has a population of 804 inhabitants.

Situated in a picturesque setting on the slope of a mountain crowned by a Templar castle ruined in the Carlist Wars. The road enters the village through a tunnel that pierces an impressive rock wall. At the entrance of the tunnel is the site of Llovedor with the shrine of the Llovedor.

From its medieval past, linked to the Knights Templar, it has retained a beautiful urban area of narrow streets and steep, with an expansion along the road which is declared cultural interest. Are of great interest the Gothic church of San Miguel, the town hall with arcades, the shrine of the Virgen del Agua, the Gothic fountain and some houses emblazoned. Near the town is the castle, the medieval aqueduct and the chapel of Llovedor.

Villages
In Castellote's extensive municipal term are located many populated and depopulated places that have had relevance in the past. Among the populated are:
 Abenfigo
 Los Alagones
 La Algecira
 El Crespol
 Cuevas de Cañart
 Dos Torres de Mercader
 Ladruñán
 Luco de Bordón
 Las Planas de Castellote
 Mas de Ricol
Uninhabited or virtually uninhabited, are the nuclei of many farms, including: El Alconzal, El Huergo, El Mas de Blasco, Torremocha, Perojil, el Mas de Soler, el Mas de Lej, El Higueral, El Latonar and other. Some were inundated by reservoir waters Santolea, like Mas de Campos, and the village  which gives its name, Santolea, was abandoned and demolished after construction.

References

External links 

 Ayuntamiento de Castellote
 Noticias de Castellote, Foro, el día a día de este pueblo turolense
 CAI Aragón-Castellote
 Castellote
 Datos Básicos
 Descripción
 Camping Municipal de Castellote

Municipalities in the Province of Teruel
Maestrazgo